Julius Eduard Reintam (27 January 1883 Kernu Parish, Harju County - 3 July 1965 Nissi Parish, Harju County) was an Estonian politician. He was a member of Estonian Provincial Assembly.

References

1883 births
1965 deaths
Members of the Estonian Provincial Assembly
Members of the Estonian Constituent Assembly